Thomas Douglas Allsup (November 24, 1931 – January 11, 2017) was an American rockabilly and swing musician.

Personal life 
Allsup was born near Owasso, Oklahoma in 1931, and was an enrolled member of the Cherokee Nation. Allsup had a son, Austin, who is also a musician and competed as a contestant on the 11th season of The Voice.

Career 
Allsup worked with entertainers such as Buddy Holly, including playing lead guitar on "It's So Easy!" and "Lonesome Tears", as well as playing with Bob Wills & His Texas Playboys. Allsup was touring with Holly, Ritchie Valens, and J.P. "The Big Bopper" Richardson when he serendipitously lost a fateful coin toss with Valens for a seat on the plane that crashed, killing Valens, Holly, Richardson, and pilot Roger Peterson on February 3, 1959. Investigators initially thought that Allsup had died in the crash due to the fact that he had given Holly his wallet so that Holly could use Allsup's ID to claim a mailed letter on his behalf. Allsup moved to Los Angeles, played with local bands, and did session work, including songwriting credits for The Ventures "Bluer Than Blue","Guitar Twist", "Opus Twist". Tommy is known to be playing the lead guitar for these tunes on The Ventures albums, "The Colorful Ventures" and "Twist With The Ventures".

He returned to Odessa, Texas, where he worked with Ronnie Smith, Roy Orbison, and producer Willie Nelson. He was also producer on the futuristic, prophetic trans-Atlantic & Australasian hit, "In the Year 2525" by one-hit-wonders Zager & Evans.  Later in 1968, he moved to Nashville, where he did session work and produced Bob Wills' 24 Great Hits by Bob Wills and His Texas Playboys. In the mid-1970s Allsup served as the producer for a pair of Asleep at the Wheel albums.

In 1979, he started a club named Tommy's Heads Up Saloon in Fort Worth. The club was named for Allsup's coin toss with Valens 20 years beforehand.

The last surviving member of Buddy Holly's "touring" Crickets for the 1959 Winter Dance Party, Tommy Allsup died on January 11, 2017, at 85 years old in a hospital in Springfield, Missouri after complications from hernia surgery.

See also
 The Day the Music Died

Further reading

References

External links
 Online biography
 Oklahoma Music Hall of Fame—Tommy Allsup
 Encyclopedia of Oklahoma History and Culture – Allsup, Tommy
 Voices of Oklahoma interview with Tommy Allsup. First person interview conducted on September 8, 2011, with Tommy Allsup. 
 Tommy Allsup - MyBestYears.com INTERVIEW SPOTLIGHT

1931 births
2017 deaths
Cherokee Nation artists
People from Owasso, Oklahoma
Guitarists from Oklahoma
American rockabilly guitarists
American male guitarists
Native American musicians
Western swing performers
Record producers from Texas
People from Odessa, Texas
Grammy Award winners
American country guitarists
20th-century American guitarists
Country musicians from Texas
Country musicians from Oklahoma
20th-century American male musicians
20th-century Native Americans
21st-century Native Americans